187 Ride By is the debut album of the gangsta rapper Tweedy Bird Loc.

Track listing 
 "Fu'k the South Bronx" (KRS-One & Tim Dog Diss) (featuring Att Will, Hitman D, D-Mark & Nini X) (5:18)
 "Fu'k Y'all" (intro) (1:03)
 "What's Really Goin On" (N.W.A., Boogie Down Productions, Tairrie B, & Tim Dog Diss) (6:11)
 "My Dick Is Prejudice" (Feat Nini X) (5:03)
 "Comin' Out the Cage" (featuring Att Will, Hitman D, Notorious Joe, D-Mark & Nini X) (4:20)
 "Who's Makin Love" (intro) (0:47)
 "Stupid Shit"  (4:27)
 "Hoe Is a Bitch" (Eazy-E, H.W.A. & Kokane Diss) (featuring Nini X) (5:06)
 "Tweedy's Teed Off" (4:08)
 "187 Ride By" (featuring Big D Mark) (3:33)
 "Punk Motha Fu'ka" (intro) (0:20)
 "Murder One" (featuring Nini X) (4:23)
 "Sell Out News Flash" (intro) (0:26)
 "Takin' Out the Judges" (4:43)
 "Smoking Chronic" (intro) (1:08)
 "Compton Blocks" (featuring Geek & Noise) (4:15)
 "Black Court in Session" (featuring Nini X) (4:05)
 "Homies Here and Gone" (intro) (1:22)
 "You Don't Hear Me Though" (4:18)
 "Jackin for Transpo" (4:21)

Samples
 "Fu'k the South Bronx" samples "Get Up and Get Down" by The Dramatics
 "What's Really Goin On" samples "Back to Life" by Soul II Soul & "Ain't No Future In Yo Frontin'" by MC Breed
 "187 Ride By" samples "Disco to go" - Brides of Funkenstein, "Mothership Connection" by Parliament and "Even When you Sleep" by The S.O.S. Band
 "Comin, Out the Cage" samples "Give Up the Funk (Tear the Roof Off the Sucker)" and "Big Bang Theory" by Parliament
 "Hoe Is a Bitch" samples "No Vaseline" by Ice Cube
  "Compton Blocks" samples "Brick House" by The Commodores
 "You Don't Hear Me Though" samples "Do That Stuff" by Parliament and Trapped by 2Pac

References

1992 debut albums
Tweedy Bird Loc albums
G-funk albums